The 2002–03 season was the 34th campaign of the Scottish Men's National League, the national basketball league of Scotland. The season featured 10 teams; from the previous season, Arbroath Musketeers and East Lothian Peregrines joined the league and Aberdeen Buccaneers did not return. City of Edinburgh Kings won their first league title.

Teams

The line-up for the 2002–03 season featured the following teams:

Arbroath Musketeers
Boroughmuir
City of Edinburgh Kings
Clark Erikkson Fury
Dunfermline Reign
East Lothian Peregrines
Glasgow d2
Glasgow Storm
St Mirren Reid Kerr College
Troon Tornadoes

League table

 Source: Scottish National League 2002-03 - Britball

References

Scottish Basketball Championship Men seasons
basketball
basketball